MTV Shows (formerly MTV ®) was a British pay television channel. It was launched on 8 November 2007.

On 1 March 2010, MTV ® was rebranded to MTV Shows. MTV Shows was removed from Virgin Media on 28 August 2010, along with MTV +1 and MTV Classic, to make room for Comedy Central HD.

MTV Shows was rebranded as MTV Music on 1 February 2011.

Programming

 The Real World
 Everybody Hates Chris
 Pimp My Ride
 Next
 Sanchez Get High
 16 and Pregnant
 Ride With Funkmaster Flex
 Parental Control
 Date My Mom
 That '70s Show
 My Own
 Jackass
 The Ren and Stimpy Show
 Wildboyz
 Mr Meaty
 Viva La Bam
 Punk'd
 My Super Sweet 16
 MADE
 Scarred
 Celebrity Deathmatch
 Dirty Sanchez
 MTV Cribs
 SpongeBob SquarePants
 Hogan Knows Best
 Brooke Knows Best
 South Park
 Rob & Big
 Life of Ryan
 Fur TV
 I Love New York
 Laguna Beach
 Run's House
 The Hills
 Nitro Circus
 Teen Wolf
 Teen Mom
 Awkward.

 Teen Mom: Young & Pregnant

References

External links
MTV Shows at MTV.co.uk

MTV channels
Television channels and stations established in 2007
Television channels and stations disestablished in 2011
Defunct television channels in the United Kingdom